Ranchi is the capital of the Indian state of Jharkhand. Ranchi was the centre of the Jharkhand movement, which called for a separate state for the tribal regions of South Bihar, northern Odisha, western West Bengal and the eastern area of what is present-day Chhattisgarh. The Jharkhand state was formed on 15 November 2000 by carving out the Bihar divisions of Chota Nagpur and Santhal Parganas. Ranchi has been selected as one of the hundred Indian cities to be developed as a smart city under PM Narendra Modi's flagship Smart Cities Mission.

During the time of the British Raj, the city was the summer capital of Bihar, because of its cold climate during the winter season. Ranchi is also one of the oldest cities in Jharkhand. Jagannath Temple and Ratu Palace are some sights which witnessed the history of Ranchi.

Ranchi is rapidly growing its economy, and certain parks, special economic zones and industrial areas are being developed. Of late, new sectors and modern areas have been built for the city's development. Ranchi is also nicknamed the 'City of Waterfalls'.

Etymology
According to one popular tale, Captain choose "Archi" a Oraon tribal village as headquarters. Archi means Bamboo forest in local Nagpuri dialect. The British inadvertently named "Archi" as "Ranchi". Captain Thomas Wilkinson renamed Kishunpur village as Rachi. Up to 1927, the place was known as Rachi.

In his book The Mundas and Their Country, anthropologist Sarat Chandra Roy writes that the name of the city is derived from the Mundari word aranchi or "short stick" used in driving cattle.

According to another local story, the name of Ranchi comes from a local bird named "Rici" which was mostly found in the Pahari Mandir premise.  Rici is name for Black Kite (Milvus migrans) in Mundari language, the modern-day landmark of Ranchi city, the Pahari Mandir, is also known as Rici Buru (रिचि बुरु) - the hill of the kites, and the city originated on the foothills of Rici Buru with the construction of Bada Talab by Commissioner Thomas Wilkinson at the same site.

History

The early evidence of use of several iron slag, pot sheds, iron tools found in Chota Nagpur region around 1400 BCE. Magadha Empire exercised indirect control over the territory, which lasted until the reign of the Ashoka. Armies of Samudra Gupta passed through the region on their expedition to the Deccan. In 4th century CE, Nagvanshi king Raja Pratap Rai chose Chutia as his capital which is now a place in Ranchi. Few ruins of Chutia trace back to 2nd Century CE. With the expansion of the Mughal Empire, the sovereign status of the Nagvanshi dynasty was technically affected, but they continued to rule and administer independently.  Thakur Ani Nath Shahdeo made Satranji as capital of Barkagarh estate near Subarnarekha river. He built Jagannath Temple in 1691.

After Battle of Buxar, Nagvanshi became vassal of East India Company. British reduced Nagvanshi rulers to Jamindar in 1817 due to rebellion of Jagirdars under Nagvanshi against tax imposition by East India Company and directly ruled Chotanagpur. In 1833, Captain Wilkinson established headquarter of the South-West Frontier agency in the village of Kishunpur, which he renamed into Ranchi after the hamlet located at the foot of the Hill. In 1855, Thakur Vishwanath Shahdeo declared independene from British rule. British attacked Satranji but he defeated British forces. He ruled independently for two years. In Indian Rebellion of 1857, Thakur Vishwanath Shahdeo led soldiers of Ramgarh Battalion with Madhav Singh who was Jamadar of Ramgarh Battalion.  Pandey Ganpat Rai, Tikait Umrao Singh and Sheikh Bhikhari also joined rebellion. They attacked British in Ranchi and compelled to flee them. But later they were defeated by East India company forces in Chatra and in Pithuriya with the help of king of Pithuriya, Jagatpal Singh and hanged. British made Ranchi as municipality in 1869 and Ranchi was first termed as a town in the census of 1872. Nagvanshi shifted their capital to Ratu from Palkot in 1870. Udai Pratap Nath Shah Deo built Ratu Palace in Ratu in 1900. He donated large tracts of land to built the infrastructure of city. Freedom fighter Birsa Munda died in the Ranchi jail on 9 June 1900. In 1912, Jyotirindranath Tagore, the eldest brother of Rabindranath Tagore, settled in Ranchi. Tagore Hill, where his house was located, has been named after him in remembrance. The last ruler of the Nagvanshi dynasty was Lal Chintamani Sharan Nath Shahdeo (1931–2014).

After Independence, Ranchi saw significant increase in its population. Its population rate of growth was 3.5% in 1901 to 1941, which increased to 14% in 1951–1971. This was because of increased industrial and educational institutions being set up, as well as the arrival of post-Partition refugees. Ranchi became an 'administrative-cum-industrial' town in 1958 when Heavy Engineering Corporation was set up. The succeeding years saw Ranchi becoming the headquarter for the following: Steel Authority of India Ltd and Central Coalfields Ltd. The city remained the summer capital of Bihar till the creation of Jharkhand in 2000, when Ranchi became the capital of the new state.

Geography
Ranchi lies at  near to the Tropic of Cancer. Ranchi is located in the southern part of the Chota Nagpur plateau, which is the eastern section of the Deccan plateau.

Ranchi has a hilly topography and its dense tropical forests a combination that produces a relatively moderate climate compared to the rest of the state. However, due to the uncontrolled deforestation and development of the city, the average temperature has increased.

Climate
Although Ranchi has a humid subtropical climate (Köppen Climate Classification: Cwa), its location and the forests surrounding it combine to produce the unusually pleasant climate for which it is known. Summer temperatures range from 20 to 42 °C, winter temperatures from 0 to 25 °C. December and January are the coolest months, with temperatures dipping to the freezing point in some areas (Kanke). The annual rainfall is about 1430 mm (56.34 inches). From June to September the rainfall is about 1,100 mm.

Demographics

Population

 India census, Ranchi Municipal Corporation has a population of 1,073,427, The urban agglomeration had a population of 14,56,528 making it the 32nd most populous urban agglomeration in India. Males constitute 52.1% of the population and females 47.9%. Ranchi has an average literacy rate of 87.68%.

The city witnessed a sudden surge in population after the declaration of the new state of Jharkhand in 2000. Owing to the rising employment opportunities and opening of numerous regional and state level offices, banks and FMCG companies, the city witnessed a rapid influx of employment seeking migrants. As per a study done by ASSOCHAM in late 2010, Ranchi was one of the highest employment generating Tier-III cities in India with a share of 16.8%, followed by Mangalore and Mysore.

Language

Hindi is the lingua franca in Ranchi. Nagpuri is regional language of the region. Hindi is spoken by 7,99,133, Urdu by 1,30,457, Bengali by 37,450, Kurukh by 24,762 people, Mundari by 24,858 and 16,746 people speaks Maithili.

Religion 

Hinduism is the prominent religion of Ranchi followed by 64.31% of the population. Islam is the second most followed religion in the city by 16.42% of the people. Minorities are Christians 8.52%, Sikhism 0.39%, Jains 0.22%, Buddhists 0.06%, those that did not state a religion are 0.35%, and others are 9.72%.

Governance and politics

Civic administration 

At the time of the creation of the state of Jharkhand in 2000, the Bihar Municipal Act, 1922 was adapted as the Jharkhand Municipal Act, 2000 to govern all ULBs in the new state. Ranchi Municipal Corporation was governed by its own municipal act, the Ranchi Municipal Corporation Act, 2001. With the enactment of the Jharkhand Municipal Act 2011, these two ceased to be in effect and the 2011 became the only governing legislature for all city governments in Jharkhand.

Under section 26 of the Jharkhand Municipal Act, 2011, the positions of mayor and deputy mayor are elected directly i.e. the position holders are voted in by the people themselves. The last municipal election was in 2018 with a voter turnout of 49.3%, up from 38% in the last election in 2013. Asha Lakra and Sanjiv Vijayawargia – both from the Bharatiya Janta Party – won the mayoral and deputy mayoral seats. The 2018 municipal election was the first time the mayoral and deputy mayoral candidates in Jharkhand could use political party symbols, while the candidates for councilor seats continued to use symbols allotted to them by the Jharkhand State Election Commission. The next municipal election will take place in 2023.

The Jharkhand Municipal Act, 2011 mandates the establishment of ward committees for each ward in the municipality. Though ward committees have been formed in Ranchi, they are not active.

Lok Sabha and Vidhan Sabha Constituencies 
Ranchi city is part of the Ranchi Lok Sabha Constituency. Sanjay Seth won the seat in the 2019 General Election and represents this constituency at the Lok Sabha as a Member of Parliament. Ranchi is part of the Ranchi Vidhan Sabha Constituency and the representative Member of Legislative Assembly at the Jharkhand Vidhan Sabha is Chandreshwar Prasad Singh. Singh has held the post since 2000, with the last Jharkhand Vidhan Sabha election being in 2019. Both politicians belong to the Bharatiya Janata Party.

Public utilities 

The various infrastructure and civic services demands of the city are met by different entities, including Ranchi Municipal Corporation, state government departments, and parastatal organisations. The Ranchi Master Plan 2037 was created by a private consultant firm under the clientship of the Ranchi Municipal Corporation, Urban Development and Housing Department, and Ranchi Regional Development Authority. Roads in Ranchi are developed and maintained by the municipal corporation, Jharkhand Government, Ranchi Regional Development Authority, and National Highways Authority of India. The Water Supply Section of the municipal corporation is responsible for issuing water connections, maintaining hand pumps in wards, collecting water usage charges and fines, whereas the state government Drinking Water Supply and Sewerage Department supplies the water. The Health Department of the corporation is responsible for the Solid Waste Management of the city. RMC operates buses in the city and has outsourced this to a private agency.

Economy
Ranchi is one of the major industrial cities of Eastern India and located in the region called 'Ruhr of India' (Chota Nagpur) making it an ideal place for mineral based industries. Ranchi has presence of many well-known government and private organisations in the vicinity of city. SAIL-R&D, MECON.Ltd, Garden Reach Shipbuilders & Engineers (Marine Diesel Engine Project), Central Coalfields, CMPDI.Ltd, Subarnarekha Hydel Project (JSEB), Usha Martin.Ltd (Wire Rope Division), DVC, STPI-Ranchi, Heavy Engineering Corp., Palriwal Industries, Pensol India, Waxpol Industries, Jharkhand Mega Food Park etc. are the prominent industries here.

The Federation of Jharkhand Chamber of Commerce & Industries (FJCCI), ASSOCHAM, MSME-DI and JIADA are major apex industrial bodies present here. JIADA consists many industrial areas in Ranchi, e.g. – Kokar, Tatisilwai, Namkum etc. are among them.

As per a study done by ASSOCHAM in late 2010, Ranchi was the highest employment generating Tier-III cities in India followed by Mangalore and Mysore. MECON Ltd Company has its headquarters in Ranchi at Ashok Nagar. Jharkhand Industrial Area Development Association has its office in Namkum. Central Coalfields also has its headquarters in Ranchi.

Ranchi houses a number of companies. Along with Jamshedpur, Dhanbad, Bokaro and Giridih it is one of the industrial hubs of the city. Here are the following companies which are based in Ranchi and also headquartered in Ranchi itself:Mecon limited, Central Coalfields, Heavy Engineering Corporation, Central Mine Planning and Design Institute, Jharkhand Rajya Gramin Bank and Dzinex Technology

The main and major businesses here are located in Lalpur, Hindpiri, Lower Bazaar, Upper Bazaar and Doranda

STPI Ranchi has set up its branch at Namkum, Ranchi. It is usually an IT Park, which houses many IT companies. It is being planned to build more parks like this. OFFCO Park is another park which is built here. It is also a large and famous business park.

Lalpur, Doranda and Hindpiri are the business districts and financial districts in the city and the state. This place houses several shopping malls. Whole of Ranchi has several shopping malls which include: Nucleus Mall, Mall E Decor, JD Hi-Street Mall, Ranchi Central Mall, Laxmi Tower, Mall of Ranchi, City Center (Centre) Mall, Big Mall, Spring City Mall, Arakshan Shopping Mall, Shelter Mall, Ranchi Green City, Artic Mall, City Center or City Centre, City Mall and Galaxia Mall.

There are many other upcoming shopping malls and commercial projects

Education

Universities and Institutes 

 Amity University, Jharkhand
 Central Institute of Psychiatry Ranchi
 Indian Institute of Information Technology, Ranchi
 Indian Institute of Management Ranchi
 National Institute of Advanced Manufacturing Technology 
 Rajendra Institute of Medical Sciences 
Ranchi University
 Sarala Birla University

Organizations 
 Association for Parivartan of Nation
 Anjuman Islamia Ranchi

Health 
 
 Sadar Medical College and Hospital 
 Rajendra Institute of Medical Sciences
 Central Institute of Psychiatry, Kanke
 Ranchi Institute of Neuropsychiatry and Allied Sciences

Sports
Ranchi is a center for numerous sports activities, including cricket, hockey, football, and many others. The 34th National Games were successfully held in Ranchi in February 2011. An International Cricket stadium with an indoor stadium and a practice ground has been constructed. So far, this stadium has hosted three One day International matches and one T20 International match. Apart from that, this stadium has hosted two IPL 6 matches for Kolkata Knight Riders, three champions league 2013 matches and Celebrity Cricket League matches for Bhojpuri Dabanggs. A tennis academy, which was inaugurated by Sania Mirza and Shoaib Malik, also runs beside the cricket stadium. Former Indian Cricket Team Captain M.S. Dhoni lives in Ranchi. The Ranchi franchise for Hockey India League was bought by Patel-Uniexcel Group and the team named the Ranchi Rhinos.

Sports teams 
 Ranchi Rays (earlier Ranchi Rhinos)

Stadiums in Ranchi 
 Jaipal Singh Stadium
 JSCA International Cricket Stadium
 Birsa Munda Hockey Stadium 
 Birsa Munda Athletics Stadium
 Birsa Munda Football Stadium

Points of Interest 

Bhagwan Birsa Biological Park
Dassam Falls
Getalsud Dam(also known as Rukka Dam; built in 1971)
Gossner Evangelical Lutheran Church, the oldest church in eastern and northern India
Hundru Falls
Jagannath Temple, built by Thakur Ani Nath Shahdeo, Raja of Barkagarh Jagannathpur in 1691.
Jonha Falls, also known as Gautamdhara (the place dedicated to Gautam Buddha)
Kanke Dam, also known as Gonda Dam built in 1955
Rock Garden, built along Kanke Dam
Nakshatra Van
Pahari Mandir, temple dedicated to Lord Shiva
Patratu Valley
Ranchi Science Centre
Ratu Palace, capital of Nagvanshis of Chotanagpur.
Sita Falls
Ranchi State Museum, State Art museum
St.Mary's Cathedral, one of oldest church of Ranchi built in 1847
 Tagore Hill (related to Jyotindranath Tagore, brother of Rabindranath Tagore)

Notable people 

 C.P. Singh (Indian politician)
 Rajesh Chauhan, former Indian cricketer, born in Ranchi
 Deeba, Pakistani actress
 MS Dhoni, former captain of Indian Cricket Team
 Carl Haeberlin, German physician, born in Ranchi
 Madhu Mansuri Hasmukh, folk singer
 Rajesh Jais, actor
 Komal Jha, actress
 Anjana Om Kashyap, Indian journalist and news presenter
Neelu Kohli, actress
 Deepika Kumari, professional archer representing India
Supriya Kumari, actress
 Peter Mansfield, British journalist and historian, was born in Ranchi
 Pat Reid MBE MC, escapee from Colditz Castle, born in Ranchi
 Sarthak Raj, senior business intelligence analyst, Sling TV
 Anushka Sen, actress
 Gopal Sharan Nath Shahdeo, Nagvanshi prince and MLA
 Lal Chintamani Sharan Nath Shahdeo, last Nagvanshi king
 Vishwanath Shahdeo, freedom fighter, born in Barkagarh, Ranchi
 Alisha Singh, dancer and choreographer

See also 
 Ranchi Metropolitan Region
 List of cities in Jharkhand
 1967 Ranchi-Hatia riots

References

External links

 Website of the District Administration
 

 
Metropolitan cities in India